The Episcopal Burying Ground and Chapel (also known as the Old Episcopal Burying Ground (OEBG)) is located at 251 East Third Street, in Lexington, Kentucky. The land was purchased in 1832 by Christ Church as a burial ground for its parishioners. The cemetery became extremely important during the 1833 cholera epidemic, during which one-third of the congregation died.

The burial ground also contains a small chapel that was built around 1867 and is thought to have been designed by notable Lexington architect John McMurtry. The small Carpenter Gothic chapel later became a sexton's cottage.

In 1976, the burying ground and former chapel were added to the National Register of Historic Places.

The only person of color buried in the OEBG, is Rev. London Ferrill, a former enslaved man who came to Kentucky in 1811 after the death of his enslaver.  In 1821, he was ordained by the Elkhorn Baptist Association. Rev. Ferrell ministered to the black population of Lexington at the First African Church, now the First African Baptist Church. It was founded by Rev. Peter Durrett, also known as "Uncle Peter" and "Old Captain", an enslaved man of Rev. Joseph Craig, who came to Kentucky with the Baptist members of The Travelling Church from Upper Spotsylvania, Virginia in 1781.

The cemetery is not regularly open to the public, but private tours can be given by appointment.

See also

 List of Registered Historic Places in Kentucky (Fayette County to Hopkins County)

References

Additional sources
 The Advocate, The Diocese of Lexington, Summer 2008, p. 5
 Barr, Frances Swinford Keller and James D. Birchfield.  Old Episcopal Burying Ground,  Heritage Books, 2002; reprinted 2006.

External links
 
 Episcopal Burying Ground 
 Christ Church Cathedral (Lexington, Kentucky) website
 

Cemeteries on the National Register of Historic Places in Kentucky
National Register of Historic Places in Lexington, Kentucky
Episcopal church buildings in Kentucky
Carpenter Gothic church buildings in Kentucky
Churches on the National Register of Historic Places in Kentucky
Churches in Lexington, Kentucky
Episcopal chapels in the United States
Anglican cemeteries in the United States
1832 establishments in Kentucky